was a Japanese football player he is currently assistant manager Japan Football League club Verspah Oita.

Hasegawa previously played for Sagan Tosu in the J2 League.

Club statistics

References

External links

1986 births
Living people
Association football people from Kumamoto Prefecture
Japanese footballers
J2 League players
Japan Football League players
Sagan Tosu players
Verspah Oita players
Association football midfielders